Charles Brinkman (1928-2003) was an American figure skater.  He competed in pairs and won two bronze medals at the U.S. Figure Skating Championships, the first with Patty Sonnekson in 1946 and another with Carolyn Welch the following year.  Also in 1946, he won the Middle Atlantic men's figure skating title. He was later a ski instructor.

Results
(Pairs with Brinkman)

(Pairs with Welch)

References 

1928 births
2003 deaths
American male pair skaters